The following is a list of events that occurred in 1912 in philosophy.

Events 
Department of Philosophy, King's College London was established.

Publications 
Bertrand Russell, The Problems of Philosophy

Births 
 June 28 - Carl Friedrich von Weizsäcker, German physicist and philosopher

Deaths 
 March 29 - Victoria, Lady Welby, English philosopher of language

References 

Philosophy
20th-century philosophy
Philosophy by year